Richard Alexander Bevan (14 July 1834 – 18 February 1918) was a British banker and philanthropist. He is known as "the father of Cuckfield."

Early life
Richard Alexander Bevan was born on 14 July 1834 in Brighton, England. His father, Richard Bevan, was a banker. His mother, Charlotte Hunter, was the daughter of Colonel Richard Hunter. He grew up at Highcliff Lodge, a house located at 128 Marine Parade, which is located on Marine Square in Kemptown, Brighton.

He was educated at Harrow School and Trinity College, Cambridge.

Career
Bevan was a banker. He became a partner in the Brighton Union Bank which was founded in Brighton in 1805. The bank was set up by a deed of co-partnership between William Golding, James Browne, Nathaniel Hall, Richard Lashmar and Thomas West. It became Hall, Bevan, West and Bevans, before being taken over by Barclay, Bevan, Tritton, Ransom, Bouverie and Co in 1894, and going on to form part of Barclays Bank.

Philanthropy
Bevan served as a Justice of the Peace and was the Treasurer of Brighton College, a private boarding school, from 1860 to 1918.

Bevan became known as "the father of Cuckfield." He built the Queen's Hall in Cuckfield in 1897 to commemorate the Queen's Diamond Jubilee.

Personal life
Bevan married Laura Maria Polhill (daughter of Edward Polhill). They had four sons, including painter Robert Bevan, and two daughters. Their daughter Edith Bevan founded the Cuckfield Women’s Suffrage Society.

They resided on Brunswick Square, Hove, near Brighton. In 1862, they moved to Cuckfield, where he built Horsgate House in 1865.

Death
Bevan died on 18 February 1918 and is buried in the Bevan family tomb at Holy Trinity Church, Cuckfield.

References 

1834 births
1918 deaths
People educated at Harrow School
Alumni of Trinity College, Cambridge
People from Brighton
English bankers
English philanthropists
Richard Alexander
English people of Welsh descent
Barclays people
19th-century British philanthropists
19th-century English businesspeople